The Illinois Fighting Illini men's basketball team is an NCAA Division I college basketball team competing in the Big Ten Conference. Home games are played at the State Farm Center, located on the University of Illinois Urbana-Champaign's campus in Champaign. Illinois has one pre-tournament national championship and one non-NCAA tournament national championship in 1915 and 1943, awarded by the Premo-Porretta Power Poll. Illinois has appeared in the NCAA Division I men's basketball tournament 32 times, and has competed in 5 Final Fours, 9 Elite Eights, and has won 18 Big Ten regular season championships.

The team is currently coached by Brad Underwood, who was hired on March 18, 2017. Through the end of the 2017–18 season, Illinois ranks 12th all-time in winning percentage and 15th all-time in wins among all NCAA Division I men's college basketball programs.

Eras of Illini Basketball

Early years
The Fighting Illini began play in 1906 with Elwood Brown as their first coach. In 1915, Illinois won their first ever Big Ten title, going 16–0 (and 12–0 in Big Ten play) under coach Ralph Jones. They were retroactively declared champion of that season by the Helms Athletic Foundation and the Premo-Porretta Power Poll. They won two more Big Ten titles in the next nine years, both shared titles.  In 1935, they won the Big Ten once again, sharing it with Purdue. They won the Big Ten title five years later in 1942, their first unanimous Big Ten title since 1915.

When duty calls

Prior to World War II breaking out, the Fighting Illini men's basketball program had achieved a status which it had never seen prior. Under the direction of head coach and athletic director Douglas R. Mills, the Illini grouped a team of players, all around 6' 3", into a nearly undefeatable lineup later to be known as "The Whiz Kids". As freshman and sophomores, the 1941–42 Illinois Fighting Illini men's basketball team dominated the Big Ten conference basketball season by posting a 13–2 record, overall finishing with 18 wins and only 5 losses. A starting lineup of freshman and sophomores, Arthur "Jack" Smiley, Ken Menke, Andy Phillip, Ellis "Gene" Vance, Victor Wukovits and Art Mathisen, developed a winning attitude that would maintain for the next 15 years, a time period where the Illini would finish no less than third in the conference for 13 of them.
Despite being ranked No. 1 in the nation, the 1943 Illinois men's basketball squad opted not to play in the NCAA Tournament when three of its five 'Whiz Kids' were called to duty in World War II.

Harry Combes era (1947–1967)
Champaign High School basketball coach Harry Combes was hired to succeed Doug Mills as Mills left the position to focus on his duties as the athletic director. Through his first five seasons as head coach, Combes led the Fighting Illini to three NCAA Final Four appearances in 1949, 1951, and 1952. During his tenure as coach, Combes increased the Fighting Illini's offensive output by changing their style of play. Combes implemented Full-court press defense, causing turnovers at a high rate which translated into Fast break points.

In 1951, Combes signed the first black player to don an Illinois uniform, 3x All-State point guard Walt Moore of Mount Vernon. Along with teammate and future Illinois standout Max Hooper, Moore led the Rams to back-to-back state championship titles, culminating with a perfect 33-0 record in 1950.

During the 1957–58 season, Mannie Jackson and Govoner Vaughn were inserted into the starting lineup as the first two African-Americans to start and letter in basketball at Illinois. Combes also oversaw the Illini's move from Huff Hall to Assembly Hall in 1963 and during that same season the Illini won a fourth Big Ten Conference championship under Combes. However, the Illini lost to eventual national champion Loyola (Chicago) in the Elite Eight of the 1963 NCAA Division I men's basketball tournament. The following 1964–65 season, saw several upset victories over defending national champion UCLA Bruins and national powerhouse Kentucky Wildcats at Memorial Coliseum in Lexington, Kentucky.

Lou Henson era (1975–1996)

In 1975, after having taken New Mexico State (and future Illinois assistant coach Jimmy Collins) to the 1970 Final Four, Lou Henson moved to the University of Illinois to replace Gene Bartow, after Bartow left Illinois to replace the legendary John Wooden at UCLA. Henson would lead the Fighting Illini back to their glory after having a number of difficult years following the Illinois slush fund scandal (where Illinois was hit with severe penalties for infractions that other Big 10 schools had in years prior been punished much more leniently (according to Sports Illustrated) at the time). In 21 years at Illinois, Henson garnered 423 wins and 224 losses (.654 winning percentage), and with a record of 214 wins and 164 losses (.567) in Big Ten Conference games. The 214 wins in Big Ten games were the third highest total ever at the time of his retirement. At Illinois, Henson coached many future NBA players, including Eddie Johnson, Derek Harper, Ken Norman, Nick Anderson, Kendall Gill, Kenny Battle, Marcus Liberty, Steve Bardo, and Kiwane Garris.

Early 1980s

In 1981, Illinois made strides in its return to the national spotlight with a 21–8 record, a third-place Big Ten finish and an invitation to the NCAA Tournament. The team received a first-round bye in the NCAA Tournament and beat Wyoming, 67–65, in Los Angeles to advance to the regionals in Salt Lake City, where Illinois lost to Kansas State, 57–52. During this season, the Fighting Illini led the Big Ten in scoring for the second consecutive season and were again led by Eddie Johnson and Mark Smith. Guards Craig Tucker and Derek Harper arrived to add backcourt punch, and Harper began his Illini career being named First-Team Freshman All-America by ESPN and ABC.

Flyin' Illini

The top-seeded and top-ranked 1989 Illini were upset 83–81 in the Final Four on a last second basket by Michigan's Sean Higgins, ending the school's deepest run in the tournament at that time. Illinois had beaten the Wolverines by 12 and 16 points in two previous meetings that season. The 1988–89 Illinois Fighting Illini team gained the moniker "Flyin' Illini" by Dick Vitale during an ESPN broadcast that season. The team also gained national prominence for its athletic players, such as NCAA slam dunk champions Kenny Battle and Kendall Gill, as well as Lowell Hamilton, Nick Anderson, Marcus Liberty, and Stephen Bardo.

1990s
The early 1990s Illini were dominated by players such as guards Andy Kauffman, Richard Keene, and Kiwane Garris, as well as centers Shelly Clark and Deon Thomas. Thomas was at the center of a report of misconduct by Iowa Hawkeyes men's basketball assistant coach Bruce Pearl, who alleged that Thomas had been offered cash to attend Illinois. The Illini were suspended from postseason play for one season for unrelated violations uncovered during the investigation.

Lon Kruger era (1996–2000)
After longtime coach Lou Henson's departure, Illinois hired Lon Kruger to fill the vacancy for the 1996 season. Kruger was the 14th head basketball coach in program history. During his four-year tenure he compiled a 59–38 record. He immediately made an impact at Illinois leading them to a 22–10 record and a second round NCAA tournament appearance in his first year. This created excitement because of the ninth-place finish the Illini had taken just before his arrival. Kruger inherited players such as Victor Chukwudebe, Jerry Hester, Kevin Turner, Jerry Gee, Matt Heldman, Brian Johnson, Kiwane Garris and Cleotis Brown. During his four seasons at Illinois, three of which resulted in NCAA Tournament berths, (all three of which saw the Illini eliminated in the 2nd round) Kruger became the only Big Ten coach to successfully sign three consecutive Illinois Mr. Basketball winners, inking Sergio McClain, Frank Williams, and Brian Cook between 1997 and 1999.Several times during his coaching tenure the Illini were predicted to be at the bottom of the Big Ten, however he overcame adversity each time performing far better than expected.

Bill Self era (2000–2003)

Illinois picked Tulsa coach Bill Self from a list of numerous candidates, including popular assistant Jimmy Collins, to succeed Kruger, who moved on to the NBA to coach the Atlanta Hawks. Bill Self was hired to the Illini coaching staff as the 15th head coach in the history of the program. He spent his previous seven years as the head coach of Oral Roberts University and Tulsa University where he compiled an overall record of 129–71. In 2001, his first season at Illinois, Self coached his new Fighting Illini squad to a 27–8 record, a share of the Big Ten title, and a number 1 seed in the NCAA Tournament. That 27-game winning season in Self's first year was the second most winning season in school history at that time. McClain, Cook and preseason Big Ten player of the year Cory Bradford led the Illini to the Elite Eight, where they fell to eventual finalist Arizona in a much disputed contest. The Illini were accused of being overly physical most of the season, especially McClain and pesky guards Sean Harrington and Lucas Johnson (younger brother of former Illini forward Brian Johnson). The '01 Illini team also included Robert Archibald, Damir Krupalija and Marcus Griffin. With mostly the same core, Illinois followed up the season with impressive 2002 and 2003 campaigns, but fell in the Sweet 16 in 2002. He was the first head coach in the Big Ten, since 1912, to lead his team to conference championships in each of his first two seasons. It was also the first time Illinois won back-to-back titles in 50 years. Self, also, had an overall record of 78–24 in his three years as Illinois head coach. Self left for Kansas after the 2003 season.

Bruce Weber era (2003–2012)

Bruce Weber served as the head coach of Illinois basketball for nine seasons from 2003 to 2012.

After Bill Self left, Illinois AD Ron Guenther hired Weber to coach the Fighting Illini on April 30, 2003. Weber came from Southern Illinois University (SIU) in Carbondale and was touted as a loyal coach, which was valued by the Illinois AD after both Kruger and Self left Champaign with relatively short tenures. In his five seasons as head coach at SIU, Weber took the Saluki program to the top of the Missouri Valley Conference, winning league titles in 2002 and 2003. He posted records of 28–8 and 24–7 in his last two seasons, leading the Salukis to back-to-back NCAA Tournament appearances, including a run to the Sweet 16 in 2002 with wins over Texas Tech and Georgia at the United Center in Chicago. His .689 (62–28) winning percentage in MVC play ranked 12th in the long history of the league. Weber earned Missouri Valley Conference Coach of the Year honors following the 2003 season.

Illinois totaled 210 victories under Weber from 2004 to 2012. He ranks third on the Illinois career coaching wins list. He won 67.5 percent of his games while in charge of the Fighting Illini (210–101). Under Weber, the Illini had two Big Ten Championships (2004, 2005), two runner-up finishes (2006, 2009) and seven upper-division finishes.

Illinois had five players selected in the NBA draft under Weber, as Deron Williams (No. 3, Utah Jazz) and Luther Head (No. 24, Houston Rockets) were taken in the first round of the 2005 NBA draft, and James Augustine (No. 41, Orlando Magic) and Dee Brown (No. 46, Utah Jazz) were chosen in the second round of the 2006 NBA draft. Meyers Leonard was chosen 11th by the Portland Trail Blazers in the 2012 NBA draft following Weber's final season.  Utah's selection of Williams at No. 3 overall in the 2005 lottery made him the highest-drafted player in Illinois history.

2003–2004

It took just one season for Weber to etch his name in the Big Ten and Illinois record books after leading the Fighting Illini to its first outright Big Ten title in 52 years during the 2003–04 season. In leading his young team that featured just one senior on the roster, Weber became just the third coach in the history of the Big Ten to win an outright title in his first season. Illinois had to win 10 straight to end the regular season to claim the championship, including six-straight wins on the road. Illinois' 26 wins in 2003–04 tied the fourth-winningest season in school history. Weber also led the Illini to the Sweet 16 with NCAA Tournament victories over Murray State and Cincinnati.

2004–2005

Weber's second year at Illinois, the 2004–05 season, will be remembered as one of the greatest in Fighting Illini history, finishing 37–2 as the National Runner-Up in the NCAA tournament. In a remarkable year where Illinois celebrated its centennial season of basketball, the Illini reeled off 29 straight wins to start the year, tying the 12th-best start in NCAA Div. I history and the third-best start in Big Ten history. Illinois also secured its second-straight outright Big Ten championship with a 15–1 league record, as Weber became the first coach in Big Ten history to win consecutive outright titles in his first two seasons. Illinois then added a Big Ten tournament championship in addition to its regular season title. The Illini were ranked No. 1 in the nation for 15 straight weeks, including a first-ever No. 1 ranking in the final Associated Press poll.

They gained the #1 overall seed in the NCAA Tournament and prevailed in one of the most memorable games in NCAA history against Arizona. Down 15 points with around 4 minutes left, the Illini rallied with a run led by Luther Head and Deron Williams. The game was sent into overtime and the Illini pulled off a one-point win to advance to the 2005 Final Four in St. Louis. It was the Fighting Illini's first Final Four Appearance since the 1988–89 season. Against the Louisville Cardinals in the national semifinal game, the Illini posted their final victory of the season. All of the five Illini starters–Deron Williams, Luther Head, Dee Brown, James Augustine, and Roger Powell, Jr.–would eventually play in the NBA. Williams and Brown both joined the Utah Jazz roster, while Luther Head went on to play for the Sacramento Kings.

With all that Illinois accomplished during the season, Weber swept the 2005 National Coach of the Year awards, claiming the following: the Naismith Award, the most prestigious coaching award in college basketball; the Henry Iba Award, presented by the U.S. Basketball Writers Association; and, the Adolph F. Rupp Cup. Weber was also named National Coach of the Year by the NABC, Associated Press, The Sporting News, Basketball Times, CBS/Chevrolet, Victor Awards and Nike Championship Basketball Clinic.

2005–2006

Despite losing three starters and 63 percent of its scoring from the 2004–05 NCAA runner-up squad, Weber directed the 2005–06 Illini to a third-consecutive 4829-win season, a runner-up finish in the Big Ten, the second round of the NCAA Tournament, and a ranking among the nation's top 17 teams throughout the entire season. The Illini spent the majority of 2005–06 ranked in the Top 10 and recorded 26 wins on the year to tie the fourth-winningest season in school history. The Illini were given a number 4 seed in the NCAA tournament, where they beat Air Force in the opening round, before falling to the University of Washington in the second round.

2006–2012

The 2006–07 team finished with a record of 23–12 (9–7) and finished tied for fourth in the Big Ten. With a depleted roster that had six different players combine to miss a total of 58 games due to injury, the Illini still advanced to the NCAA Tournament. They were awarded a 12 seed and lost in the opening round to Virginia Tech.

The 2007–08 season was one of the worst seasons in Illinois history, highlighted be a string of close losses. The lone bright spot came as Illinois came on strong to win four of its last five and five of its final seven games, which culminated with a runner-up finish at the Big Ten tournament. Weber's Illini became the first No. 10 seed in the tournament's history to advance to the title game, winning three games in three days with victories over Penn State, No. 17 Purdue and Minnesota to reach the championship game vs. No. 8 Wisconsin. However, with an overall record of 16–19 (5–13), the Illini were not selected to participate in postseason play.

Weber's 2008–09 UI squad was one of the most improved teams in the country finishing with a record of 24–10 (11–7). With 10 more regular season victories than it achieved the year before, Illinois posted the third-biggest turnaround in NCAA Division I and the second-biggest turnaround among BCS programs on the year. The Illini recorded 24 wins, ranking as the 10th-winningest season in school history. Illinois was the Big Ten runner-up, earned a No. 5 seed in the 2009 NCAA Tournament, and finished the year ranked 24th in the Pomeroy rankings. The Illini lost in the first round of the NCAA tournament to the 12th seeded Western Kentucky Hilltoppers.

The 2009–10 season, the Illini finished 21–15 (10–8), and finished 5th in the Big Ten. The team was widely considered to be "on the bubble" for the NCAA tournament, and missed the tournament field by a narrow margin. The Illini competed in the NIT, falling at home to the Dayton Flyers in the NIT Quarterfinals.

Illinois rebounded in 2010–11 to finish 20–14 (9–9), and tied for fourth in the Big Ten. The Illini were selected to join the NCAA tournament as a #9 seed, where they defeated the #8 seeded UNLV Rebels setting up a matchup with the #1 seeded Kansas Jayhawks and former coach Bill Self. Kansas proved to be to much for the Illini, and the season came to an end in the round of 32.

In 2011–12, Weber's last as coach of the Illini, the team finished 17–15 (6–12), good for 9th in the conference. The team did not compete in the postseason. Weber was fired by Illinois' new AD Mike Thomas after the 2011–12 season.

John Groce era (2012–2017)

John Groce was hired by new athletic director Mike Thomas on March 28, 2012. In the 2012–13 season the Illini were the 2012 Maui Invitational Tournament champions and later made the 2013 NCAA Division I men's basketball tournament, losing their second game. The Illini lost 63–59 to the 2013 ACC men's basketball tournament champions Miami Hurricanes. The Illini spent 8 weeks nationally ranked in the 2012–13 NCAA Division I men's basketball rankings, and for two weeks were ranked as high as 10th in the country.

In 2014, Groce continued Illinois' success in the month of November, improving to 21–0 under Groce and 32–0 overall during the past four seasons. Illinois is the only program in the nation with an undefeated November record dating back to 2011. The 2014–2015 season was once again disappointing for the Illini. Illinois finished with a record of 19–14, finishing tied for 7th place in the Big Ten with a record of 9–9. The Illini were then beaten in the first round of the NIT.

The 2015–2016 season ended with the fewest total wins in almost 20 years, since the 98–99 Lon Kruger crew won only 14 games. Groce's squad finished with a record of 15–19, taking 12th place in the Big Ten and receiving no post season tournament invitations.

The 2016–2017 basketball season was another disappointing season for the Fighting Illini, as they finished the season at 18–14 and 8–10 in conference, failing to make the NCAA Tournament for the fourth consecutive year. On March 11, 2017, the university announced via press release that Groce had been relieved of his duties as head men's basketball coach. The next day, the team was put into the NIT as a 2-seed. The team was coached during the NIT by interim coach Jamall Walker, making it to the quarterfinals before being eliminated by the University of Central Florida.

Brad Underwood era (2017–present)
On March 18, 2017, Brad Underwood was hired by athletic director Josh Whitman. Underwood previously coached at Stephen F. Austin from 2013 to 2016, before spending one year at Oklahoma State. In Underwood's first season at Illinois, the team won each of their first five contests. After beginning conference play 0–8, they ended the season with a record of 14–18.

2018-19 season

While the 2018–19 season featured the debut of key pieces including Ayo Dosunmu, Giorgi Bezhanishvili, Andres Feliz, and Alan Griffin, the Illini posted one of the worst records in program history at 12–21 (7–13 in Big Ten). Despite the poor record, the Fighting Illini had many memorable moments such as upsetting #9 Michigan State at home and Freshman Giorgi Bezhanishvili scoring 35 points versus Rutgers, breaking the Illinois record for most points by a freshman in a game.

2019-20 season

This season was the freshman year of highly ranked center Kofi Cockburn. The Illini started off the season slow in the first game, barely beating Nicholls State 78–70 in OT. In the Big Ten-ACC Challenge, Illinois played Miami (FL) where they lost 81–79 after mounting a huge comeback and a charge being called against Dosunmu on the final play of the game. The next game they traveled to Maryland to play against the #3 ranked Terrapins and the Illini led by 14 at half. Maryland then outscored Illinois 34–19 in the second half and won the game by an Anthony Cowan free throw. The Illini next played the 5th ranked Michigan Wolverines at the State Farm Center and beat them 71–62 to improve to a 7–3 record. Over the next 12 games, the Illini went 10–2, including an Ayo Dosunmu game-winning shot at Michigan to give Illinois a 64–62 lead with 0.5 seconds on the clock. The Fighting Illini finished the season 21–10 with a 13–7 conference record and 4th in the Big Ten.

2020-21 season

This was the season that Underwood finally had mostly his recruits running the team and it certainly showed on the court. After much deliberation, Ayo Dosunmu returned to Illinois for his junior season instead of going to the NBA. He, along with Kofi Cockburn, helped make Illinois into a top 10 team.  They went 16-4 (0.800) in the B1G conference but had a worse record than Michigan (14-3, 0.824), and therefore did not earn even a share of the title.  The team went on to win the Big Ten tournament title after a hard fought, overtime 91-88 win over OSU.  Illinois became a #1 seed in the NCAA Tournament for the 4th time in school history.  They were upset by Loyola-Chicago in the 2nd round and finished the season 24-7.  Dosunmu became the first player in Illini history to earn 1st-team All-America honors by the AP. Cockburn was named to the AP All-American 2nd-team.

Facilities

State Farm Center (1963–present)
The State Farm Center(nee The Assembly Hall) opened on March 2, 1963, and hosts the home games for the men and women's basketball teams. The architect of the Building was Max Abramovitz, an alumnus. It is internationally known for its unique engineering design.  The stadium is the third largest dome in the state of Illinois following only the United Center and All-State Arena. The Illinois High School Association has also taken advantage of its size hosting numerous events including the men and women's state championships, along with the wrestling state championships. The stadium has also recently been named a landmark and joins Wrigley Field as the only two athletic sites on the list.

The stadium has been described as one of the toughest places to play because of the student section dubbed the "Orange Krush". The Orange Krush sits on three sides of the court, including around each basket. It has become customary for the fans of the stadium to wear orange to the games.

Ubben Basketball Practice Complex (1998–present)
The 2-story, 40,000 square foot building is home to the University of Illinois Men's and Women's basketball programs. The facility includes offices, locker areas, weight training facilities and team meeting rooms in addition to the practice basketball courts. The Illinois Champions Campaign was a major catalyst of the $40 million renovation.

Huff Hall (1925–1963)
Huff Hall is a 4,050-seat multi-purpose arena in Champaign, Illinois, United States. The arena opened in 1925 and was known as Huff Gymnasium until the 1990s. It is named after George Huff, who was the school's athletic director from 1895 to 1935. Huff Hall is home to the University of Illinois Fighting Illini volleyball and wrestling teams. Prior to the opening of Assembly Hall in 1963, it was home to the basketball team as well.

Kenney Gym (1905–1925)
Kenney Gym Annex is a 5,000-seat multi-purpose arena which is the practice facility for the Fighting Illini gymnastics team. Prior to the opening of Huff Hall in 1925, Kenney Gym housed the Illinois Fighting Illini men's basketball team. It also was home to the Women's Volleyball program from 1974 until 1989, after which the program moved to Huff Hall in 1990.

Championships

National Championships

Big Ten Regular Season Championships

§–Conference Co-champions

Big Ten tournament championships

Statistical leaders

All-time leaders
Points: Deon Thomas (2,129)
Assists: Bruce Douglas (765)
Rebounds: James Augustine (1,023)
Steals: Bruce Douglas (324)
Blocks: Nnanna Egwu (201)

Season leaders
Points: Donnie Freeman (668, 1966)
Assists: Deron Williams (264, 2005)
Rebounds: Skip Thoren (349, 1965)
Steals: Kenny Battle (89, 1989)
Blocks: Derek Holcomb (86, 1979)

Game leaders
Points: Dave Downey (53, 1963)
Assists: Demetri McCamey (16, 2010), Tony Wysinger (16, 1986)
Rebounds: Skip Thoren (24, 1963)
Steals: Bruce Douglas (8, 1984)
Blocks: Derek Holcomb (11, 1978)

Career milestones

 

Source for all statistical leaders

Individual honors

Naismith Memorial Basketball Hall of Fame
The following 6 Fighting Illini have been inducted into the Basketball Hall of Fame:

Source

National Collegiate Basketball Hall of Fame
The following 4 Fighting Illini have been inducted into the National Collegiate Basketball Hall of Fame:

Olympians

International championships

Consensus All-American
8 Illini were recognized as consensus first team All-Americans.

NCAA Men's Basketball All-American
Key to abbreviations:
AP Associated Press, Arg Argosy, Ath Athletic Publications, BN Basketball News, BT Basketball Times, BKW Basketball Weekly, BW Basketball Writers of America, Col Colliers, Con Converse, CSAF Citizens Savings Athletic Foundation, Helms Helms Foundation, INS International News Service, K Kodak, Look Look magazine, MSG Madison Square Garden, NABC National Association of Basketball Coaches, NEA Newspaper Enterprise Association, Omaha Omaha World Newspaper, PM Pic Magazine, SN Sporting News, True True Magazine, UP United Press, W Wooden
1st First Team, 2nd Second Team, 3rd Third Team, HM Honorable Mention1915 Ray Woods–1st (Helms)
1916 Ray Woods–1st (Helms)
1917 Ray Woods–1st (Helms), Clyde Alwood–1st (Helms)
1918 Earl Anderson–1st (Helms)
1920 Chuck Carney–1st (Helms)
1922 Chuck Carney–1st (Helms)
1937 Harry Combes–2nd (Omaha)
1938 Lou Boudreau–1st (MSG), Louis Dehner–3rd (Con)
1939 Louis Dehner–1st (MSG), 3rd (Con)
1940 Bill Hapac–1st (Helms, Con)
1942 Andy Phillip–1st (Helms), 2nd (PM), 3rd (Con), Jack Smiley–HM (SN), Art Mathisen–HM (SN), Ken Menke–HM (SN, Con), Gene Vance–HM (SN)
1943 Andy Phillip–1st (Con, PM, Helms, SN, AP, UP, NEA, Look,), Jack Smiley–3rd (Con), Art Mathisen–HM (Con), Gene Vance–HM (Con)
1944 Walt Kirk–HM (Con)
1945 Walt Kirk–1st (Helms, Con), 2nd (AM), HM (Con)
1946 Jack Burmaster–HM (SN), Bob Doster–HM (SN)
1947 Andy Phillip–1st (True, NABC), HM (Con), Jack Smiley–3rd (Helms), HM (Con), Gene Vance–HM (Con)
1948 Dwight Eddleman–2nd (AP), 3rd (Con, True), Jack Burmaster–HM (Con)
1949 Bill Erickson–1st (Helms, Col, NABC), 3rd (SN, UP), 4th (Con), Dwight Eddleman–1st (Con), 2nd (AP, UP)
1950 Bill Erickson–HM (Con)
1951 Don Sunderlage–2nd (Helms, SN), 3rd (UP, Con), HM (AP), Ted Beach–HM (Con), Rod Fletcher–HM (Con)
1952 Rod Fletcher–1st (Look, Con, Helms), 2nd (AP, UP, INS, NABC, Col, Ath), John Kerr–HM (AP, UP, Con), Irv Bemoras–HM (UP, Con), Jim Bredar–HM (UP, Con), Bob Peterson–HM (UP)
1953 Irv Bemoras–2nd (Con, Helms, Look), HM (AP), Jim Bredar–2nd (Con, Helms, Look, INS), 3rd (AP), John Kerr–HM (AP, INS, Con)
1954 John Kerr–2nd (Helms), 3rd (Look, AP, UP), 4th (Con)
1955 Bill Ridley–HM (AP, Con), Paul Judson–HM (INS, Con), George Bon Salle–HM (Con)
1956 Paul Judson–2nd (Con), 3rd (NABC, UP, NEA), HM (INS), Bill Ridley–2nd (Con), 3rd (NABC, UP, AP), Bruce Brothers–HM (Con), Harv Schmidt–HM (Con)
1957 Harv Schmidt–2nd (Con), George Bon Salle–2nd (NABC) HM (Con), Don Ohl–HM (AP, Con)
1958 Don Ohl–2nd (Con), 3rd (Helms), Govoner Vaughn–HM (Con)
1959 Roger Taylor–HM (Con)
1960 Mannie Jackson–HM (Con), Govoner Vaughn–HM (Con)
1961 Dave Downey–HM (Con), John Wessels–HM (Con)
1962 Dave Downey–HM (Con), Bill Burwell–HM (Con)
1963 Dave Downey–1st (Helms), 2nd (Con), HM (AP), Bill Small–HM (Con)
1964 Tal Brody–HM (SN, Con), Duane Thoren–HM (Con)
1965 Duane Thoren–1st (Helms), 2nd (AP, Con), 3rd (UPI, BN, NABC), Bogie Redmon–HM (Con), Tal Brody–1st (Helms), 2nd (SN, Con)
1966 Donnie Freeman–1st (Helms), 2nd (Con, BN), HM (UPI), Rich Jones–HM (Con)
1967 Jim Dawson–HM (Con), Dave Scholz–HM (Con)
1968 Dave Scholz–1st (Helms), HM (Con)
1969 Dave Scholz–1st (Helms), 3rd (AP), HM (Con)
1970 Mike Price–HM (Con)
1972 Nick Weatherspoon–HM (Con)
1973 Nick Weatherspoon–1st (CASF, Helms), HM (Con)
1974 Jeff Dawson–HM (Con)
1975 Rick Schmidt–HM (Con)
1977 Audie Matthews–HM (Con), Levi Cobb–HM (Con)
1983 Derek Harper–2nd (AP, Con), 3rd (BN)
1984 Bruce Douglas–3rd (UPI)
1987 Ken Norman–2nd (AP, BW, SN, K), 3rd (BT, NABC), HM (UPI)
1988 Nick Anderson–HM (SN), Kenny Battle–HM (SN)
1989 Nick Anderson–HM (AP, UPI, SN), Kenny Battle–HM (AP, UPI, SN), Kendall Gill–HM (SN)
1990 Kendall Gill–1st (UPI), 2nd (BKW), 3rd (AP, SN, NABC)
1994 Deon Thomas–HM (AP)
2001 Frank Williams–1st (W), 3rd (AP, NABC), Cory Bradford–HM (AP)
2002 Frank Williams–2nd (NABC) HM (AP)
2003 Brian Cook–2nd (SN), 3rd (AP, NABC, BT)
2004 Dee Brown–HM (AP)
2005 Dee Brown–1st (W, BW, SN) 2nd (AP, NABC, BT), Luther Head–2nd (AP, NABC, BW), Deron Williams–1st (W), 2nd (NABC, SN), 3rd (AP)
2006 Dee Brown–2nd (AP, BW, NABC)
2021 Ayo Dosunmu–1st
2021 Kofi Cockburn–2nd
2022 Kofi Cockburn–1st

 

National Player of the Year
Ray Woods–1917
Chuck Carney–1922
Andy Phillip–1943
Dee Brown–2005
Ayo Dosunmu–2021

National Coach of the Year
Bruce Weber–2005

National Freshman of the Year
Kofi Cockburn–2020

 

Bob Cousy Award
Dee Brown–2006
Ayo Dosunmu–2021

Frances Pomeroy Naismith Award
Dee Brown–2006

 

NCAA All-Decade Team
Dwight "Dike" Eddleman–1940s

NCAA Final Four All-Tournament Team
Jim Bredar–1952
Johnny "Red" Kerr–1952
Luther Head & Deron Williams–2005

NCAA Tournament Regional Most Outstanding Player
Nick Anderson–1989
Deron Williams–2005

Big Ten Player of the Year
Andy Phillip–1943
Dwight "Dike" Eddleman–1949
Don Sunderlage–1951
Johnny "Red" Kerr–1954
Jim Dawson–1967
Bruce Douglas–1984
Frank Williams–2001
Brian Cook–2003
Dee Brown–2005

Big Ten Defensive Player of the Year
Bruce Douglas–1985 & 1986
Stephen Bardo–1989
Dee Brown–2005

Big Ten Freshman of the Year
Cory Bradford–1999
Brian Cook–2000
D.J. Richardson–2010
Kofi Cockburn–2020

Big Ten Sixth Man of the Year
Andre Curbelo–2021

Big Ten tournament Most Outstanding Player
Brian Cook–2003
James Augustine–2005
Ayo Dosunmu–2021

Big Ten Coach of the Year
Lou Henson–1993
Bruce Weber–2005

Jordan Brand Classic
Why is a player having played in a HS tournament relevant?  This article is excessively long.  Remove this section?  Comment made March 26 '22.

The following 4 Jordan Brand Classic participants have played for Illinois:

Nike Hoop Summit
Why is a player having played in a HS tournament relevant?  This article is excessively long.  Remove this section?  Comment made March 26 '22.

The following 4 Fighting Illini have played in the Nike Hoop Summit:

McDonald's All-Americans
Why is a player having played in a HS tournament relevant?  This article is excessively long.  Remove this section?  Comment made March 26 '22.

The following 13 McDonald's All-Americans have played for Illinois:

Mr. Basketball
The following 15 Mr. Basketball award winners have played for Illinois:

Fighting Illini of note

First round NBA draft picks

Fighting Illini in the NBA

Fighting Illini in the NBA G League

Fighting Illini playing internationally

Fighting Illini currently coaching

Fighting Illini basketball media members

Illinois honored players

All-Century Team
In 2004, during the celebration of the program's 100th year of basketball as a varsity sport, the University of Illinois Division of Intercollegiate Athletics announced its All-Century Team. The 20-man team was selected after online voting by fans and the Illinois Basketball Centennial Committee. The honorees were feted during the Illinois Basketball Centennial Reunion Weekend, Jan. 28–30, 2005.

Honored jerseys
The University of Illinois has honored its most decorated basketball players in school history by hanging a banner with their name and number from the rafters of State Farm Center. A total of 34 men's players have their jersey honored. To have his jersey honored, a player must have met one of the following criteria:

National Player of the Year
Enshrined in the National Basketball Hall of Fame
Member of an American Olympic team
Big Ten Player of the Year
First- or second-team Consensus All-America
Illinois All-Century Team Member
Individual whose pioneering efforts made a significant impact on Illinois and international basketball

Dike Eddleman Award
The University of Illinois Athlete of the Year was first awarded in 1940. The award was annually given to a male student-athlete until it was discontinued in 1973. Revived in 1983, the University of Illinois now recognizes both male and female athletes who have distinguished themselves in athletic achievement. In 1993, the awards were named in honor of former Olympian Dwight "Dike" Eddleman, who participated in basketball, football and track and field in 1943 and 1946–49, earning a combined 11 varsity letters during that timeframe. The following list includes Illini basketball players who earned the award.

Big Ten Medal of Honor
Since 1915, the Big Ten Medal of Honor has been awarded annually at each conference school to a male and female senior student-athlete who demonstrates proficiency in scholarship and athletics. The award has become the top annual award the University of Illinois Division of Intercollegiate Athletics bestows. The following list includes Illini basketball players who earned the award.

Postseason
NCAA Tournament seeding historyThe NCAA began seeding the tournament with the 1979 edition.NCAA tournament results
The Fighting Illini have appeared in the NCAA tournament 33 times. Their combined record is 41–32.

NIT results
The Fighting Illini have appeared in the National Invitation Tournament (NIT) seven times. Their combined record is 10–7.

Head-to-head Big Ten records

 Men's basketball records at Kenney Gym and Huff Hall 

Notes:
*Denotes incomplete or partial records.
**Played 9 games at Huff Hall but played final 2 games at Assembly Hall.
(N/R) denotes no records''

See also
NCAA Men's Division I Final Four appearances by coaches
ACC–Big Ten Challenge

References

External links
 

 
Basketball teams established in 1906
1906 establishments in Illinois